The Doncaster Free Press is a weekly newspaper in Doncaster, South Yorkshire, England. It is owned by National World.

Content of the newspaper 
The Free Press, or DFP as it is sometimes known, is published each Thursday and is currently priced at £1.50.
Its sections include news, sport, crime, Your Week, Let's Talk (letters), In Court, Business, Education, Retro, Walks, Your Puzzles, Entertainment and Travel,, jobs, promotions and competitions, puzzles, property and motors as well as an extensive classified and display advertising section featuring family announcements.

Industrial action of 2011 

On 15 July 2011, NUJ-represented staff employed within the Doncaster Free Press walked out on indefinite strike, along with those from the South Yorkshire Times, the Goole Courier and the Selby Times. Staff returned on 8 September to allow talks to commence, after 55 consecutive days away from work.

Offices 
Its offices are at The Balance, Pinfold Street, Sheffield. The paper left its Sunny Bar home of 89 years to move to new premises in January 2014. Reporters still live and work in Doncaster. It was first published on 18 June 1925.

Current and previous editors of the Free Press 
The current editor of the newspaper is Nancy Fielder.
Previous editors are Phil Bramley, Chris Burton, Graeme Huston, Merrill Diplock, Martin Edmunds, Richard Tear, Leonard Peet, Maurice Coupe and the paper's founder and first editor, Richard "Dickie" Crowther. These are the only editors in the entire history of the newspaper.

It is part of the National World publishing empire.

Other publications 
The SYN stable also used to include paid-for weekly titles such as South Yorkshire Times, Epworth Bells and Crowle Advertiser, Gainsborough Standard and Worksop Guardian. Former titles such as the Selby Times, as well as free titles the Doncaster Advertiser, Goole and Howden Courier and Thorne and District Gazette are now either defunct or have been swallowed into other publications.

References 

Newspapers published in Yorkshire
Mass media in Doncaster
Publications established in 1925
1925 establishments in England
Newspapers published by Johnston Press